Keep Calm, a thriller set in the United Kingdom, it's the 2016 debut novel by Mike Binder.

Plot
Adam Tatum, an American ex-cop, is tricked into a plot to overthrow the British prime minister.

References

External links

2016 American novels
American thriller novels
English-language novels
Henry Holt and Company books
Novels set in the United Kingdom
2016 debut novels